Xenorhabdus magdalenensis  is a bacterium from the genus of Xenorhabdus which has been isolated from the nematode Steinernema australe which has been isolated from the Isla Magdalena National Park on Chile.

References

Further reading

External links
Type strain of Xenorhabdus magdalenensis at BacDive -  the Bacterial Diversity Metadatabase

Bacteria described in 2012